Tosson Hill is the highest hill in the Simonside Hills to the south of Rothbury in Northumberland, England.

This has now changed, as the area is ‘access land’ under the terms of the Countryside and Rights of Way Act 2000.

The sandstone crags at Ravensheugh on the northern side of Tosson Hill offer a variety of short rock climbing routes. They are usually less busy than crags within the Simonside Forest.

Marilyns of England
Hills of Northumberland